Guillermo Antonio Díaz Ayala (born 16 May 1994) is a Chilean footballer who last played for Deportes Puerto Montt as a left back.

Career
After suffer and injury shortly after his arrive to Universidad de Chile, Díaz finally debuted for la U in a match against Deportes Iquique for the 2014 Torneo Clausura.

References

External links
 
 Guillermo Díaz at PlaymakerStats

Living people
1994 births
People from Temuco
Chilean footballers
Unión Temuco footballers
Universidad de Chile footballers
Deportes Temuco footballers
San Luis de Quillota footballers
Rangers de Talca footballers
Deportes Valdivia footballers
Puerto Montt footballers
Primera B de Chile players
Chilean Primera División players
Association football defenders